The Eindhoven University of Technology, abbr. TU/e, is a public technical university in the Netherlands, located in the city of Eindhoven. In 2020–21, around 14,000 students were enrolled in its BSc and MSc programs and around 1350 students were enrolled in its PhD and PDEng programs. In 2021, the TU/e employed around 3900 people.

Eindhoven University of Technology has been ranked in the top 200 universities in three major ranking systems. The 2019 QS World University Rankings place Eindhoven 99th in the world, 34th in Europe, and 3rd in the Netherlands.

TU/e is the Dutch member of the EuroTech Universities Alliance, a strategic partnership of universities of science & technology in Europe: Technical University of Denmark (DTU), École Polytechnique Fédérale de Lausanne (EPFL), École Polytechnique (L’X), The Technion, Eindhoven University of Technology (TU/e), and Technical University of Munich (TUM).

History

The Eindhoven University of Technology was founded as the Technische Hogeschool Eindhoven (THE) on 23 June 1956 by the Dutch government. It was the second institute of its kind in the Netherlands, preceded only by Delft University of Technology.

Undergraduate education was given in four- or five-year programs until 2002, styled along the lines of the German system of education; graduates of these programs were granted an engineering title and allowed to prefix their name with the title ir. (an abbreviation of ingenieur; not to be confused with graduates of technical hogescholen, who were engineers abbreviated ing.). Starting in 2002, following the entry into force of the Bologna Accords, the university switched to the bachelor/master structure (students graduating in 2002 were given both an old-style engineering title and a new master's title). The undergraduate programs are now split into two parts, a three-year bachelor program and a two-year master program.

Strategic Vision 2020

On 3 January 2011, the university's strategic vision document for the period up to 2020, the "Strategic Plan 2020", was presented. This vision included establishing a University College to foster both depth, breadth, and societal relevance in engineering education; establishing a combined Graduate School to manage the graduate programs; an increase of the student body by 50 percent; a 50 percent increase in the number of annual PhDs awarded; an increase of knowledge "valorisation" (exploitation by industry and society) to a campus-wide score of 4.2; increasing the international position of the university to within the top-100 universities; and increasing the embedding of the university within the city and the Brainport region by transforming the campus into a high-grade science park with laboratories, housing facilities for 700 students and researchers and supporting facilities. The science park was one of the more costly elements of the plan.

Campus 
All departments and student facilities are centered along the full length of the Groene Loper.

A number of existing buildings have been renovated and some new buildings erected. For existing buildings the aim is to retain as much of the present materials as possible, supplemented with redeveloped portions of the existing premises and new, sustainable materials. The approach adopted for new buildings is to pursue optimal energy neutrality. There are four large projects.

Organization
The Eindhoven University of Technology is a public university of the Netherlands. As such its general structure and management is determined by the Wet op het Hoger Onderwijs en Wetenschappelijk Onderzoek (English: Law on Higher Education and Scientific Research). Between that law and the statutes of the university itself, the management of the university is organized according to the following chart:

Executive board
The day-to-day running of the university is in the hands of the executive board (Dutch: College van Bestuur). The executive board (EB) monitors the academic departments and service organizations, plus the local activities of the Stan Ackermans Institute. The EB consists of three people, plus a secretary:

The president The president is the chair of the EB and acts as the main face of the university to the outside world. Over the last few years the post has been held by people from outside the university, chosen from high levels of industry. The current president is Robert-Jan Smits, the former Director-General of Research and Innovation at the European Commission.
The rector magnificus The rector magnificus is the only member of the EB whose membership is mandated by law. The law allows the university to appoint a rector in any way, but the university statutes determine that the rector magnificus must be an active professor at the university (and must have been that before being appointed rector); in practice the rector is always a former department dean. The rector is the voice of the academic staff in the EB and guards the academic interests of the university in the EB. The current rector magnificus is Frank Baaijens.
The vice president The third member is a "tie-breaker" member of the EB. The post is open to anybody (but generally not filled by an academic staff member). The current vice president is Nicole Ummelen.
The secretary The secretary is not a member of the EB, but a university staff member that does secretarial work for the EB, keeping the minutes and records and taking care of communication between the EB and the university. The EB secretary is usually the secretary for the entire university. The current secretary is Susanne van Weelden.

Oversight of the executive board
There are two bodies that supervise the Executive Board:

 The Supervisory Board is an external board of five people appointed by the Minister of Education (one member is appointed, based on a nomination by the University Council). This Board provides external oversight of the running of the university, including changing of the statutes, the budget, and other strategic decisions.
 The University Council is a council of 18 people, half of whom are elected from the university staff (academic and otherwise) and half from the student body. The University Council is informed of the running of the university by the executive board at least twice a year and may advise the EB as it sees fit. It guards against discrimination within the university. And the council must agree to changes in the management structure. The Council membership is open to all students and personnel, except those persons who are in the supervisory board, the executive board or who are the University Secretary.

Departments and service organizations
Most of the work at the university is done in the departments and the service organizations.

 The departments take care of most of the research and education at the university; each one is run by its professors, headed by the dean. The deans are all members of the executive deliberation meeting, which is a regular meeting of the deans and the rector.
 The service organizations provide services to the inhabitants of the university campus. Examples of these organizations include the housing organization, the ICT organization and the Communication Expertise Center (which does external communications, including to the press). Each service organization is headed by an organization head.

Both for the departments and the service organizations, the staff (and students) are involved with the running of the body. For that reason both types of bodies have advisory councils which have advisory and co-decision authorities.

TU/e Holding B.V.
Over the past two decades, the TU/e has increasingly developed commercial interests and off-campus ties. These include commercial agreements and contracts directly between the university and external companies, but also interests in spinoff companies. In order to manage these kinds of contractual obligations the university started the TU/e Holding B.V. in 1997. The Holding is a limited company, dedicated to the commercial exploitation of scientific knowledge.

Service organizations
There university is more than just the departments, research bodies and the students. There are several ancillary activities necessary to the running of the university, activities that cross the boundaries and interests of the different departments. These activities are carried out by the universities' service organizations.

The university has the following service organizations:

Academics

Rankings

Eindhoven is currently (2018) ranked between 51 and 141 in the world (the university itself provides a survey), and a top ten technical university in Europe.

In a 2003 European Commission report, TU/e was ranked as third among European research universities (after Cambridge and Oxford, at equality with TU Munich and thus making it the highest ranked Technical University in Europe), based on the impact of its scientific research.
In 2011 Academic Ranking of World Universities (ARWU) rankings, TU/e was placed at the 52-75 bucket internationally in Engineering/Technology and Computer Science ( ENG ) category and at 34th place internationally in the Computer Science subject field.

Education
The scientific departments (or faculties; Dutch: faculteiten) are the primary vehicles for teaching and research in the university. They employ the majority of the academic staff, are responsible for teaching and sponsor the research schools and institutions.

The departments also offer PhD programs (Dutch: promotiefase) whereby a qualified master may earn a PhD Unlike in anglo-saxon countries these are not educational programs, however; rather, a person working towards obtaining the PhD is a research employee of the university.

The TU/e has nine departments:
 Biomedical Engineering
 Built Environment
 Electrical Engineering
 Industrial Design
 Chemical Engineering and Chemistry
 Industrial Engineering & Innovation Sciences (formerly Technology Management)
 Applied Physics
 Mechanical Engineering
 Mathematics and Computer Science

Honors programs
The university offers honors programs aimed at both bachelor and master students. At the bachelor level it consists of intensive study within eight possible areas or tracks. At the master level it consists of personal leadership and professional development components, over and above the normal masters study.

Postgraduate doctorate of engineering (PDEng) 
In 1986, the university started a number of programs for a postgraduate doctorate of engineering (PDEng) together with two other Dutch technological universities (TU Delft and University of Twente). These programs are managed by the Stan Ackermans Institute on behalf of the 4TU Federation. Each program is two years in length. Ten programs are available at the TU/e:

 Automotive Systems Design
 Clinical Informatics
 Data Science
 Healthcare Systems Design
 Information and Communication Technology
 Process and Product Design
 Qualified Medical Engineer
 Smart Buildings and Cities
 Software Technology
 User-System Interaction

Nationally, more than 3,500 students have earned the postgraduate PDEng degree through this program. On 13 February, Ravi Thakkar was awarded 3000th PDEng diploma at TU/e

Other educational programs
The university hosts a number of other educational programs that are in some way related to the main educational programs. These include the teacher's program and an MBA program.

Eindhoven School of Education: Teacher's education for masters, to get their higher education teaching certificate. Also does research into educational sciences and innovation in education.
TIAS School for Business and Society: A shared MBA program with the University of Tilburg, for university graduates.
HBO minor program: Bachelor programs for students of HBO universities (four-year bachelor programs), to allow them access to university master programs.

Research
The TU/e participates in a large number of research institutes which balance in different ways between pure science and applied science research. Some of these institutes are bound strictly to the university, others combine research across different universities.

Top in research partnerships with industry
The TU/e is among the world's ten best-performing research universities in terms of research cooperation with industry in 2011 (Number 1 in 2009). Ten to 20 percent of the scientific publications of these ten universities in the period 2006–2008 were the result of partnerships with researchers in industry. As well as TU/e and Delft University of Technology, the top 10 also includes two universities in Japan (Tokyo Institute of Technology and Keio University in Tokyo), two in Sweden (CTH Chalmers University of Technology and KTH Royal Institute of Technology in Stockholm), and one each in Denmark (DTU Technical University of Denmark in Lyngby), Finland (University of Helsinki), Norway (Norwegian University of Science and Technology in Trondheim) and the USA (Rensselaer Polytechnic Institute in Troy, New York).

Admissions and costs

Admissions 
The admission process is similar to other universities in the Netherlands, especially other 4TU institutions. The university provides various infographics to explain the process in their website.

Bachelors 
Some bachelors have a numerus fixus, while others do not. This may differ from year to year.

Masters 
Due to an agreement, students that have graduated from another 4TU institution may qualify for direct admission.

Costs 
Fees at the TU/e differ between students, according to the following table from the official website:

Scholarships 
Students from countries of the European Economic Area (EEA) may be eligible for a grant or loan from the Dutch government.

Graduate 
TU/e offers a small number of graduate scholarships. Some have requirements in terms of study focus, while others are available to all students. However, in order to qualify one must have already been accepted at the university.

Off-campus activities
The TU/e plays a central role in the academic, economic and social life of Eindhoven and the surrounding region. In addition the university maintains relations with institutions far beyond that region as well and participates in national and international events (sometimes through the student body).

Economic and research motor
The TU/e is enormously important to the economy of the Eindhoven region, as well as the wider areas of BrabantStad and the Samenwerkingsverband Regio Eindhoven. It provides highly skilled labor for the local knowledge economy and is a knowledge and research partner for technology companies in the area.

The historic basis for the university's role as an economy and research motor was the interaction with Philips. The university was founded primarily to address the need of Philips for local personnel with academic levels of education in electronics, physics, chemistry and later computer science. Later that interest spread to DAF and Royal Dutch Shell (which became the primary employer for graduates of the chemistry department). There was also a synergy with these companies in that senior personnel were hired from them to form the academic staff of the university (which led to the Eindhoven joke that the university trains the engineers and Philips trains the professors).

Changing economic times and business strategies changed the relationship during the 1980s and 1990s. As Philips started moving away from the region, its importance to the region and the university decreased. A struggle for economic survival forced the university to seek closer ties with the city and region of Eindhoven in the 1989–1995 period, resulting in the creation of the Brainport initiative to draw high tech business and industry to the region. The university started expending more effort in knowledge valorisation, in incubating technology startups, in providing direct knowledge support for local technology companies. Also the academic interests of the research shifted with the times, with more effort going into energy efficiency research, green technologies, and other areas of interest driven by social relevance (the call for better technology in the medical field, for example, led to cooperation with the Catharina Hospital and the University of Maastricht medical department and finally the creation of the Biomedical Technology department).

The TU/e is host (and in some cases also commissioner) of a number of highly successful research schools, including the ESI and the DPI. These research institutes are a source of high-tech knowledge for high-tech companies in the area, such as ASML, NXP and FEI. The university also plays a large role as knowledge and personnel supplier to other companies in the High Tech Campus Eindhoven and helps incubate startups through the Eindhoven Twinning Center and The Gate. It is also a knowledge supporter of the automotive industry in the Helmond region. The valorization strategy of TU/e has already led to various spin-offs, including Lusoco, NC Biomatrix, Taylor, SMART Photonics, EFFECT Photonics and MicroAlign. This appears especially the case around integrated photonics, as the last three examples are part of the photonic chip ecosystem PhotonDelta.

In the extended region, the TU/e is part of the backbone of the Eindhoven-Leuven-Aachen triangle. This economic cooperation agreement between three cities in three countries has created one of the most innovative regions in the European Union (measured in terms of money invested in technology and knowledge economy); the agreement is based on the cooperative triangle that connects the three technical universities in those cities.

Eindhoven Energy Institute
As of the summer of 2010, the TU/e is host to the Eindhoven Energy Institute (EEI). The EEI is a virtual research institute (meaning that it doesn't have any actual offices or facilities), which manages and coordinates the activities of a large number of groups and subinstitutes in the general area of sustainable and alternative energy technologies.

The scientific director of the institute is prof.dr.ir. David Smeulders. He is pro forma head of the research department, which is split into four key areas: Built Environment (energy usage and patterns in building, headed by prof.dr.ir. Jan Hensen from the Department of the Built Environment), Future Fuels (headed by prof.dr. Philip de Goey of Mechanical Engineering), Energy Conversion (headed by prof.dr.ir. René Janssen from Chemical Engineering) and Fusion and Plasma (headed by prof.dr. Niek Lopes Cardozo from Physics). The EEI also incorporates the Graduate School on Sustainable Energy, which the TU/e had already established together with the TU Munich and DTU Lyngby. Secretarial services will be provided by the Center Technology for Sustainable Development (TDO) which also already existed at the TU/e (since 1994).

Energy research at the TU/e is among the best in academic Europe (a February 2010 study by Reed Elsevier puts it second only to Imperial College London). This fact, as well as the unique attention to energy in the built-up environment, drew the attention of the European Institute of Innovation and Technology. The EEI is now a full co-location of EIT's KIC on Sustainable Energy (InnoEnergy).

International cooperation and appeal
The TU/e maintains active academic cooperation with sister institutions in many different countries, for example:

 National University of Singapore, Singapore
 Zhejiang University, China
 Shanghai Jiao Tong University, China
 Fudan University, China
 Northeastern University (China), China
 Georgia Institute of Technology, US
 Northwestern University, US
 Carnegie Mellon University, US
 RMIT University, Australia
 Middle East Technical University, Turkey
 Katholieke Universiteit Leuven, Belgium

The TU/e also provides education to an increasing number of foreign students and graduates. According to the 2009 annual report in the academic year 2008–2009 there were 490 exchange students, 103 foreign nationals registered in a bachelor program, 430 in a master program, 158 in a professional doctorate program (79% of the total). In 2009 the university employed 37 foreign professors (15.9% of the total) and 16 foreign associate professors (12.8%). Overall, 29.5% of the university staff was non-Dutch.

In 2011/2012, the TU/e has Erasmus bilateral agreements with many universities in 30 countries across Europe in a diverse range of subjects for student exchange.

Technological sports
In addition to the "regular" types of sports practiced among the student body and by the staff, the TU/e collaborates with the student body in a number of "technology sporting efforts". These usually take the form of cross-department projects, which makes them multidisciplinary efforts. Some examples include:

Robot football In 2010 TechUnited, the university's robot football team, won the European Championship, came second for the third time in a row at the world championship in Singapore and finally won the world championship in 2012. The team is part of the Mid-Size league of RoboCup.
Auto racingThe TU/e hosts and sponsors a student race team, University Racing Eindhoven (URE). This team competes annually in the Formula Student and other races with self-built racers. Starting in 2010 the team switched from a petrol engine to an electric car; this car came third at Silverstone, second at Hockenheim and won the Formula Student in its first year.

The university also hosts and sponsors a student race team, Solar Team Eindhoven (STE), that enters cars named Stella into the biannual World Solar Challenge since 2013, winning the Cruiser class competition both in 2013 and 2015. Another student racing initiative is the Automotive Technology InMotion team, a collaboration between the TU/e and Fontys University of Applied Sciences. The team has the aim to compete in the 2020 24 Hours of Le Mans

Student life

Community 
TU Eindhoven has over 110 community bodies that members of TU may participate in. They are related to sports, culture, faith, staff, international students and hobbies, as well as university political parties, student teams, and study associations for each faculty.

Student teams 
Currently TU/e has various accredited student teams which address challenges in the fields of sustainability, artificial intelligence, health and mobility.

Notable people

Notable alumni 

 Wil van der Aalst, Dutch computer scientist
 Stefan Bon, chemical engineer at the University of Warwick
 Jo Coenen, Dutch architect and former Chief Architect of the Netherlands
 Martijn van Dam, member of the House of Representatives (2006–10, 2010–12)
 Marijn Dekkers, Chairman of Unilever
 Jan Dietz, Dutch computer scientist
 Teun van Dijck, member of the House of Representatives (2006–10, 2010–12)
 Camiel Eurlings, Dutch Minister of Transport, Public Works and Water Management (2006–2010)
 Gerard Kleisterlee, Chairman of Vodafone and a former president and chief executive officer of Royal Philips Electronics
 Arno Kuijlaars, mathematician, professor at the Katholieke Universiteit Leuven
 G.M. Nijssen, Dutch computer scientist
 Itay Noy, Israeli watchmaker
 Ralf Mackenbach, Singer
 Kees Schouhamer Immink, president Turing Machines Inc, digital pioneer, winner Emmy Award, recipient IEEE Medal of Honor
 Sjoerd Soeters, architect
 René van Zuuk, Dutch architect

Notable faculty

 Jacques Benders, mathematician
Andries Brouwer, mathematician and computer programmer
 Nicolaas Govert de Bruijn, mathematician
 Henk Buck, professor of chemistry
 Jo Coenen, Dutch architect and former Chief Architect of the Netherlands
 Henk Dorgelo, physicist and first rector magnificus
 Edsger W. Dijkstra, mathematician and computer scientist, Turing Award winner 1972
 Hugo Christiaan Hamaker, physicist
 Hubert-Jan Henket, architect
 Alexandre Horowitz, mechanical engineer; inventor of the Philishave
 Arie Andries Kruithof, physicist, discovered the Kruithofeffect and Kruithofcurve
 Piet Lemstra, inventor of the Dyneema fibre
 Jack van Lint, mathematician
 Harry Lintsen, historian in technology history, former chairman Foundation for the History of Technology
 Archer Martin, Fellow of the Royal Society, 1952 Nobel laureate in chemistry (professor TU/e 1964–1974)
 Bert Meijer, chemical engineer, pioneer in polymer research
 Sjoerd Romme, professor of Entrepreneurship & Innovation
 Johan Schot, historian, professor of technology history
 Bettina Speckmann, computer scientist
 Piet Steenkamp, lawyer, co-founder of the CDA
 Martinus Tels, chemical engineer, rector magnificus, pioneer of waste management processes in the Netherlands
 Wietse Venema, programmer and physicist

Notable honors for research done at the university

 prof. dr. ir.René de Borst: Spinozapremie (1999)
 prof. dr. Bert Meijer: KNCV Gold Medal (1993), Arthur K. Doolittle Award (1995), Spinozapremie (2001), Wheland Medal 2010/2011
 prof.dr.ir. René Janssen: KIvI/NIRIA Speurwerkprijs 2010, Spinozapremie (2015)
 prof. dr.ir. Jaap Schouten: Simon Stevin Master 2006

Notes

References

External links 

 Official website in English

 
Educational institutions established in 1956
Technical universities and colleges in the Netherlands
Science and technology in the Netherlands
1956 establishments in the Netherlands
Buildings and structures in Eindhoven
Education in Eindhoven